The Georgia Bulldogs football statistical leaders are individual statistical leaders of the Georgia Bulldogs football program in various categories, including passing, rushing, receiving, total offense, defensive stats, and kicking. Within those areas, the lists identify single-game, Single season and career leaders. The Bulldogs represent the University of Georgia in the NCAA's Southeastern Conference.

Although Georgia began competing in intercollegiate football in 1892, the school's official record book often does not generally include statistics from before the 1950s, as records from this era are often incomplete and inconsistent.

These lists are dominated by more recent players for several reasons:
 Since 1950, seasons have increased from 10 games to 11 and then 12 games in length.
 The NCAA didn't allow freshmen to play varsity football until 1972 (with the exception of the World War II years), allowing players to have four-year careers.
 Bowl games only began counting toward single-season and career statistics in 2002. The Bulldogs have played in a bowl game every year since this decision, giving recent players at least one extra game each year to accumulate statistics. The Bulldogs have played in the College Football Playoff National Championship three times (in 2017, 2021, and 2022), giving players in those seasons yet another game. Similarly, the Bulldogs have played in the SEC Championship Game 10 times since first qualifying in 2002.
 The Bulldog teams under recent head coach Mark Richt, who coached from 2001 through 2015, have had some of the highest-gaining offenses in Georgia history. All 5 of the top 5 seasons in team total offense have come under Richt.
 Due to COVID-19 issues, the NCAA ruled that the 2020 season would not count against the athletic eligibility of any football player, giving everyone who played in that season the opportunity for five years of eligibility instead of the normal four.

These lists are updated through the 2021 season. The Georgia Football Media Guide generally does not list a full top 10 in the single-game records.

Passing

Passing yards

Passing touchdowns

Rushing

Rushing yards

Rushing touchdowns

Receiving

Receptions

Receiving yards

Receiving touchdowns

Total offense
Total offense is the sum of passing, rushing, and receiving statistics. It does not include returns.

Total offense yards

Touchdowns responsible for
"Touchdowns responsible for" is the NCAA's official term for combined passing and rushing touchdowns.

Defense

Interceptions

Tackles

Sacks

Kicking
The 2014 Georgia Football Media Guide does not list a full top 10 in field goal kicking stats.

Field goals made

Field goal percentage

References

Georgia